Conus adamsonii, common name the rhododendron cone, is a species of sea snail, a marine gastropod mollusk in the family Conidae, the cone snails and their allies.

Like all species within the genus Conus, these snails are predatory and venomous. They are capable of "stinging" humans, therefore live ones should be handled carefully or not at all.

The species was described from a specimen in the collection of John Adamson.

Description 
The size of the shell varies between 26.4 mm and 56 mm. The spire is depressed, channeled and striate. The body whorl is grooved above and below, smooth in the middle. The color of the shell is rosy white, with numerous small triangular chestnut spots and three bands of violaceous and chestnut clouds and reticulations.

Distribution 
This marine species occurs off the Marquesas Islands.

References 

  Petit, R. E. (2009). George Brettingham Sowerby, I, II & III: their conchological publications and molluscan taxa. Zootaxa. 2189: 1–218
 Puillandre N., Duda T.F., Meyer C., Olivera B.M. & Bouchet P. (2015). One, four or 100 genera? A new classification of the cone snails. Journal of Molluscan Studies. 81: 1–23

External links 
 The Conus Biodiversity website
 Cone Shells – Knights of the Sea
 

adamsonii
Gastropods described in 1836
Taxa named by William Broderip